The Barnyard is a 1923 American film featuring Oliver Hardy and directed by Larry Semon.

Cast
 Larry Semon - Lay Zee, Farm Hand
 Kathleen Myers - The Farmer's Daughter
 Oliver Hardy - Farm Hand (as Babe Hardy)
 Frank Hayes - The Farmer's Wife
 Spencer Bell - Helper
 William Hauber
 Al Thompson
 Joe Rock

See also
 List of American films of 1923
 Oliver Hardy filmography

References

External links

1923 films
1923 short films
American silent short films
Silent American comedy films
American black-and-white films
1923 comedy films
Films directed by Larry Semon
American comedy short films
1920s American films